Caladenia amoena, commonly known as the charming spider orchid, is a plant in the orchid family, Orchidaceae, and is endemic to Victoria. It is a ground orchid which grows singly or in small groups, has a single dark green, hairy leaf and a single yellowish-green flower with red stripes. It is only known from a few sites and has been classified as Endangered.

Description

The labellum has three yellowish-green lobes, reddish in the central part, the middle lobe with about 7 pairs of broad teeth. The lateral lobes are also toothed near the mid-lobe. Flowering occurs from August to October.

Caladenia amoena is similar to C. concinna but has smaller flowers and somewhat drooping petals and sepals.

Taxonomy and naming
Caladenia amoena was first formally described by David L. Jones in 1994 and the description was published in Muelleria. The specific epithet (amoena) is a Latin word meaning "pleasant" or "delightful".

Distribution and habitat
Charming spider orchid is only known from two sites, growing in grassy box–ironbark forest in south-central Victoria, on the northern outskirts of Melbourne.

Conservation
Only 45 Caladenia amoena plants were known in 2000 and the species is classified as "Endangered"  by the Victorian government. It is also classed as "Endangered" (EN) under the Australian Government Environment Protection and Biodiversity Conservation Act 1999 (EPBC Act) and a recovery plan has been prepared.

References

amoena
Plants described in 1994
Endemic orchids of Australia
Orchids of Victoria (Australia)
Taxa named by David L. Jones (botanist)